Polonia Gdańsk (Polonia being the Latin name for "Poland") is a name that has been used by some sports teams in Gdańsk, Poland.

Former uses
SKS Stoczniowiec Gdańsk, Polish football team, formed in 1945. Known as "Polonia Gdańsk" during the 1960s–1970, and 1992–2020.
Stoczniowiec Gdańsk, Polish ice hockey team, formed in 1953. Known as "Polonia Gdańsk" from 1953 to 1970.
Lechia-Polonia Gdańsk, Polish football team, formed in 1998, dissolved in 2002. Formed by a merger between Lechia Gdańsk and Polonia Gdańsk

Both teams that are still functioning that used the Polonia Gdańsk name now go by the name Stoczniowiec Gdańsk.